Kristiyan Dobrev (born 23 September 1978 in Sofia) is a former Bulgarian footballer and assistant coach of Lokomotiv Sofia.

Career
Dobrev was raised in Lokomotiv Sofia's youth teams. Between 1998 and 2003 he played for Naftex Burgas, Dobrudzha Dobrich, and Cherno More Varna. In June 2003 he returned to Lokomotiv Sofia. He was sent on loan to Lech Poznań in January 2007 until the end of the 2006/2007 season.

Career statistics
As of 12 June 2013

References

1978 births
Living people
Bulgarian footballers
First Professional Football League (Bulgaria) players
FC Lokomotiv 1929 Sofia players
PFC Dobrudzha Dobrich players
PFC Cherno More Varna players
Lech Poznań players
Expatriate footballers in Poland
Bulgarian expatriate sportspeople in Poland
Association football defenders